Arrow River may refer to:
 Arrow River (New Zealand), a short river
 Arrow River, Manitoba, unincorporated settlement

See also
River Arrow (disambiguation)
Arrow (disambiguation)
Arrow Creek (disambiguation)